The 1906–07 season was the 34th season of competitive football in Scotland and the 17th season of the Scottish Football League.

League competitions

Scottish League Division One 

Champions: Celtic

Scottish League Division Two 

Note: Cowdenbeath were docked two points for fielding an ineligible player.

Other honours

Cup honours

National

County

Non-league honours

Senior
Highland League

Other Leagues

Scotland national team

Key:
 (H) = Home match
 (A) = Away match
 BHC = British Home Championship

Other national teams

Scottish League XI

See also
1906–07 Aberdeen F.C. season
1906–07 Rangers F.C. season

Notes

References

External links
Scottish Football Historical Archive

 
Seasons in Scottish football